WebGain was a jointly funded venture between Warburg Pincus and BEA Systems. The objective of the company was to acquire existing Java EE /Java programming language development tools and roll them together into a single application development environment: WebGain studio. In April 2000, WebGain acquired the company The Object People, and their TopLink product-line became the property of WebGain.

A number of challenges, including the dot-com crash, hastened the demise of WebGain, which closed in 2002.

See also
Visual Café
TopLink

References

Defunct software companies of the United States